Montenegrin–Ottoman War may refer to:
Montenegrin–Ottoman War (1852–53)
Montenegrin–Ottoman War (1861–62)
Montenegrin–Ottoman War (1876–78)